The Sundowners novels are a series of Western fiction novels with a steampunk twist by author James Swallow.

Set in the Old West of the late 1880s, the novels follow the adventures of gunslinger Gabriel Tyler and Native American shaman Jonathan Fivehawk as they fight the plans of Robur Drache, an insane genius in the thrall of an ancient evil known as The Faceless.

Books

Ghost Town 
Tyler and Fivehawk meet for the first time on the road to the town of Stonetree.

Underworld 
The two heroes track Drache to a mining camp in the wilderness.

Iron Dragon 
The secrets of Drache's Black Train are revealed as Tyler and Fivehawk join forces with Chinese adventurer Yu Lim.

Showdown 
The final confrontation with The Faceless takes place on the desolate prairies.

See also

List of steampunk works
Weird West

Novel series
Steampunk novels
Western (genre) novels
Novels by James Swallow
Novels set in the 1880s
2001 British novels